Botorrita is a municipality located in the province of Zaragoza, Aragon, Spain.

Botorrita is known for the archeological artefacts found there, such as the Botorrita plaques.

The Romans knew it as Contrebia Belaisca (the first probably Celtiberian from *kom- + *treb(h) "the gathering (place)").

References

External links 

 www.bandabotorrita.es Asociación Banda de Música de Botorrita "Jorge Aliaga"
Atlas del Imperio Romano
Página sobre Botorrita de J.A. Cifuentes

Municipalities in the Province of Zaragoza